"K.O." is a song by Brazilian drag queen Pabllo Vittar, released as the third single from her debut album Vai Passar Mal (2017). The song was written by Rodrigo Gorky, Maffalda and Pablo Bispo. It was released on April 19, 2017 by independent label BMT Produções. The music video was released on the same day, directed by João Monteiro and includes Malcolm Matheus as a guest, from Rede Globo's program Amor & Sexo.

Reception 
The track was officially released on April 19, 2017. On Spotify, the song has reached almost 80 million streams and has become the most successful song by a drag queen. It was also the most heard song in July 2017 in Spotify Brazil.

Commercial reception 
Without a record label, the song had difficulty getting radio airplay, so with its popularity on the internet with several covers, the track ended up being conveyed by popular demand. Thus, the song debuted on Brasil Hot 100 Airplay and Hot Pop & Popular at numbers 78 and 16, respectively.

Music video 

The video was filmed on March 24, 2017. It was directed by João Monteiro, who directed videos for also drag queens Aretuza Lovi and Gloria Groove. Malcolm Matheus plays a boxing fighter. The music video reached 2 million views in two days and soon consecrated itself as the most watched music video by a drag queen with 26.1 million views, beating Vittar's own record with Todo Dia. As of December 2017, K.O. has surpassed 260 million views on YouTube.

Track listing and formats 
Digital download
 "K.O." – 2:35
 "K.O. (Enderhax Remix)" – 4:24

Charts

References 

2017 singles
2017 songs
Pabllo Vittar songs
Portuguese-language songs
LGBT-related songs